John Frederick Godfrey (18 August 1917 at Garsington, Oxfordshire – October 1995 at Newton Abbot, Devon) was an English first-class cricketer. Godfrey was a right-handed batsman who bowled right-arm fast-medium.

Godfrey made his first-class debut for Hampshire in 1939 against the touring West Indians. This was Godfrey's sole first-class match before the Second World War. In addition to a sole first-class appearance for Hampshire, Godfrey also played two Minor Counties Championship matches for Oxfordshire, with both matches coming against Berkshire.

After the war, Godfrey returned to play for Hampshire where he made his County Championship debut against Sussex. From 1946 to 1947 Godfrey represented the county in eleven first-class matches, the last of which came against Glamorgan. Godfrey was primarily a bowler, although with the ball he failed to impress in first-class cricket with 15 wickets at an expensive bowling average of 50.20 and best figures of 4/116.

In 1948 Godfrey returned to play for Oxfordshire, where he represented the county in five further Counties Championship matches from 1948 to 1949, with his final appearance for Oxfordshire coming against Buckinghamshire.

In 1950 Godfrey joined Cambridgeshire, making his Minor Counties debut against an Essex Second XI. From 1950 to 1954 Godfrey represented Cambridgeshire in 36 matches, the last of which came against Hertfordshire.

Godfrey died at Newton Abbot, Devon in October 1995.

External links
John Godfrey at Cricinfo
John Godfrey at CricketArchive
Matches and detailed statistics for John Godfrey

1917 births
1995 deaths
People from Oxfordshire
English cricketers
Hampshire cricketers
Oxfordshire cricketers
Cambridgeshire cricketers